Faramir Colles is an area of small hills on Titan, the largest moon of the planet Saturn. The hills are located near Titan's equator at 4° north and 153° east within the Shangri-La region.

Faramir Colles is named after Faramir, a Gondorian prince in J. R. R. Tolkien's fictional world of Middle Earth who appears most prominently in The Lord of the Rings. The name follows a convention that Titanean colles (hills or small knobs) are named after characters in Tolkien's work. The name was formally announced on December 19, 2012.

References

Extraterrestrial hills
Surface features of Titan (moon)
Extraterrestrial surface features named for Middle-earth